Matteoli is a surname. Notable people with the surname include:

Altero Matteoli (1940–2017), Italian politician
Emilia Matteoli (born 1999), Italian cyclist
Gianfranco Matteoli (born 1959), Italian footballer
Jean Mattéoli (1922–2008), French politician
Paul Matteoli (1929–1988), French cyclist